Veronica "Roni" Remme (born 14 February 1996) is a Canadian-born German World Cup alpine ski racer.

From Collingwood, Ontario, Remme raced collegiately in the United States for the University of Utah and competed for Canada at the 2018 Winter Olympics and 2019 World Championships. She made her World Cup debut in December 2017 and gained her first podium in February 2019.

In January 2022, Remme was named to Canada's 2022 Olympic team.

On 12 October 2022 Remme announced that she would compete for the German national team from the 2022-23 season onwards.

World Cup results

Season standings

Top Twenty finishes

1 podium (1 AC), 4 top tens

World Championship results

Olympic results

References

External links

Roni Remme at Alpine Canada
Roni Remme at University of Utah Athletics

1996 births
Living people
Canadian female alpine skiers
German female alpine skiers
Olympic alpine skiers of Canada
Alpine skiers at the 2018 Winter Olympics
Alpine skiers at the 2022 Winter Olympics
Utah Utes athletes
Alpine skiers at the 2012 Winter Youth Olympics
Youth Olympic silver medalists for Canada